Texana Presbyterian Church is a historic church in Brackenridge Recreation Complex outside of Edna, Texas.

The church was originally built in 1859 in the former town of Texana. The church was relocated to Edna in 1884 where it was situated at the intersection of Apollo Drive and Country Club Lane. In 2001, the church was again moved to its present location along Brackenridge Parkway near Lake Texana and restored.

The church was added to the National Register of Historic Places in 1979 and designated a Recorded Texas Historic Landmark in 1981.

See also

National Register of Historic Places listings in Jackson County, Texas
Recorded Texas Historic Landmarks in Jackson County

References

Presbyterian churches in Texas
Churches on the National Register of Historic Places in Texas
Churches completed in 1860
Buildings and structures in Jackson County, Texas
National Register of Historic Places in Jackson County, Texas
Recorded Texas Historic Landmarks